Sven Lasta (18 April 1925 – 15 August 1996) was a Croatian television and film actor.

Filmography

External links

1925 births
1996 deaths
Croatian male television actors
Croatian male film actors
Golden Arena winners
People from Pakrac
20th-century Croatian male actors
Yugoslav male television actors
Yugoslav male film actors